Enver Sekiraqa 18 November 1974  i Pristina Kosovo is a native of Kosovo and a suspect sought by the Kosovo Police and Interpol in connection with an investigation into organized crime, the murder of Triumf Riza (a police officer) and several other murders and sex crimes. He was arrested in Pristina in September 2012 when he handed himself over to EULEX and the Kosovo Police after four years on the run.

Sekriaqa Bar bombing 2007 
On the morning of 24 September 2007 near Bill Clinton Boulevard, Prishtina inside Skeriqa Bar, a coffee bar owned by Sekiraqa, a bomb of type C4, killed 2 people and wounded 11 others.

References

Kosovan gangsters
Albanian gangsters
Living people
Kosovan prisoners and detainees
Prisoners and detainees of Kosovo
1974 births